HMS Redbreast was an Archer-class brig of the British Royal Navy. She captured some small merchant vessels and privateers. She also participated in two actions that would in 1847 earn her surviving crew members clasps to the Naval General service Medal (NGSM). The Navy transferred in 1816 to His Majesty's Customs. She was finally sold in 1850.

Napoleonic wars
Redbreast was commissioned by Lieutenant John Maxwell in May 1805, for the Channel. He was promoted to Commander on 22 January 1806. His replacement was Lieutenant John Bayby Harrison.Redbreast was on the Portuguese coast in July 1807.

On 19 March 1808, Sir George Mouat Keith was appointed to Redbreast on the North Sea station. 

Redbreast operated in the Channel until 1808, when she took part in the Baltic expedition. Detachments from the frigate , the sloop , and Redbreast manned two gunboats on 9 and 11 August 1808 on the Jade and Weser rivers. There they first captured a Danish privateer Mosin; four days later they captured Dutch gunboat No.106. Mosin was armed with one 4-pounder gun and had a crew of 11 men. The gunboat was armed with one 18-pounder and two 4-pounder guns. It had a crew of 23 men under the command of Lieutenant Henry Meyer. Neither side suffered any casualties.

On 16 May 1809 Redbreat captured Anna Sophia, Griffstadt, and Wannerne;  on 24 July she captured Twee Gesisters. 

In 1811 Redbreast was involved in a skirmish in the Jahde. Quebec captured a Vaisseau de Guerre of the Imperial Customs Service, later named as a privateer Christine Charlotte. She had a crew of one officer and twelve men, one of whom was killed before she struck. She was leaving Nordeney (East Frisian Islands) with a merchant vessel in tow. 

The sight of four enemy gun-brigs lying at anchor at Nordeney induced Captain Hawtayne of Quebec to despatch ten boats from the squadron, with 117 seamen and marines, to cut them out. The boats attacked, and after a hard fight captured French gunboats Nos. 22, 28, 31, 71. British casualties were four men killed (one from Redbreast), and 14 wounded; enemy casualties were two men killed and 12 wounded. In 1847 the Admiralty awarded the NGSM to all surviving claimants from the action. 

The British vessels had come to support the Russian troops under Colonel Alexander Radlinger, who were besieging the town. The two key positions were the French forts Napoleon and Phare. While the gunboats fired on Phare, the British landed a number of guns and established a battery of six 18-pounders, two 32-pounders, and two 6-pounders. Before the battery could start firing on the 30th, the French surrendered both forts. The French surrendered 26 heavy guns, two 13" mortars, and a blockhouse with a garrison of three hundred men and officers, all of whom became prisoners of war. Redbreast carried the news back to England, together with the officers captured at Phare.

On 8 July 1812 Exertion hit a shifting sandbank unknown to her pilots. The next day, as enemy gunboats approached, the decision was taken to abandon her. Redbreast removed Exertions crew and then set fire to her to prevent Exertion falling into enemy hands.

Mercurius arrived at Yarmouth on 11 November.

Redbreast captured a Danish vessel Manly and her cargo in March 1813. This may have been the former , which the Danes had captured in 1811, though the prize money notice does not make the connection.

On 3 August 1813 Redbreast and Princess Augusta captured five small vessels called "ewers".

In August 1813 Redbreast was in company with  when they captured the Danish droits Haabet and Evers, No. 73 and 123, on the 13th and 14th.

From late December 1813 the squadron, comprising Desiree, Hearty, Blazer, Piercer, Shamrock, Redbreast, and eight gun-boats (the seven from Cuxhaven plus No. 12), supported Swedish forces under the command of General Baron de Boye against the Danes in the attack on the town and fortress of Glückstadt at the Elbe river during the War of the Sixth Coalition. The British arrived on 23 December and by 25 December had erected a battery of two 32-pounder guns. (They had landed six but the poor quality of the roads meant that only two were in place.) To support the bombardment on the next day, Farquhar sent in the gunboats and the brigs, whose armament he had reinforced with two 18-pounders each from Desiree. The bombardment continued to the 28th. Glückstadt having failed to surrender, Farquhar established three more batteries, one of two 18-pounders, one of four 32-pounders, and one of the two 13" mortars captured at Cuxhaven. An English rocket brigade under Lieutenant Amherst Wright contributed to the bombardment. These batteries commenced bombarding the town on 1 January 1814, keeping it up for the next two days. On 4 January Farquhar sent in a flag of truce, and after negotiations, the governor surrendered on 5 January. British casualties overall were light. In 1847 the Admiralty awarded the NGSM to all surviving claimants from the campaign.

In 1814 the Navy re-rated Redbreast as a sloop, so that Keith could continue to command her on his promotion on 16 March 1814 from lieutenant to commander.

Post-war 
Redbreast was in Ordinary at Portsmouth in 1815. She then was converted to a customs hulk, and in 1830 a lazaretto for the Quarantine Service at Liverpool.

Fate
Redbreast was sold in Liverpool on 14 June 1850.

Notes, citations, and references
Notes

Citations

References
 
 
 
  

1805 ships
Brig-sloops of the Royal Navy